HLA-B55 (B55) is an HLA-B serotype. B55 is a split antigen from the B22 broad antigen, sister serotypes are B54 and B56. The serotype identifies the more common HLA-B*55 gene products. (For terminology help see: HLA-serotype tutorial)

Serotype
B*55:03 is one of the four B alleles that reacts with neither Bw4 nor Bw6.  The others are B*18:06, B*46:01, and B*73:01.

Allele distribution

References

5